Hypolycaena merguia is a butterfly in the family Lycaenidae. It was described by Doherty in 1889. It is found in South-east Asia.

Subspecies
Hypolycaena merguia merguia (Mergui, southern Burma, Thailand)
Hypolycaena merguia watsoni (Swinhoe, 1911) (Burma, Thailand)
Hypolycaena merguia histiaea (Fruhstorfer, 1914) (Sumatra)
Hypolycaena merguia skapane Druce, 1895 (Borneo)
Hypolycaena merguia palpatoris (Fruhstorfer, 1914) (western Java)

References

Butterflies described in 1889
Hypolycaenini
Butterflies of Borneo